Warden Run is a  long 3rd order tributary to Sugar Creek in Venango County, Pennsylvania.

Course
Warden Run rises on the Beatty Run divide about 1.5 miles north of Hannasville, Pennsylvania in Venango County.  Warden Run then flows southeast to meet Sugar Creek about 1 mile northwest of Sugar Creek, Pennsylvania in Venango County.

Watershed
Warden Run drains  of area, receives about 43.9 in/year of precipitation, has a topographic wetness index of 418.24, and has an average water temperature of 8.14 °C.  The watershed is 63% forested.

See also 
 List of rivers of Pennsylvania
 List of tributaries of the Allegheny River

References

Additional Maps

Rivers of Venango County, Pennsylvania
Rivers of Pennsylvania
Tributaries of the Allegheny River